Günter Schubert (18 April 1938 – 2 January 2008) was a German actor and voice actor. His son Alexander Schubert is also an actor. He was born in Weißwasser and died in Berlin.

Filmography
 1966: Die Söhne der großen Bärin
 1972: Sechse ziehen durch die ganze Welt
 1974: Hallo Taxi
 1974: Johannes Kepler
 1976: So ein Bienchen
 1977: Zur See
 1980: Archiv des Todes
 1982: Der lange Ritt zur Schule
 1982: Geschichten übern Gartenzaun
 1985: Neues übern Gartenzaun
 1986: Das Schulgespenst
 1987: Maxe Baumann aus Berlin
 1986: Treffpunkt Flughafen
 1988: Bereitschaft Dr. Federau
 1988: Polizeiruf 110
 1994: Elbflorenz
 1998: Leinen los für MS Königstein
 2001: Leipzig Homicide
 2003: Leipzig Homicide
 2007: Notruf Hafenkante
 2007: Cologne P.D., episode: Bremsversagen (TV series)
 2007: Chubby Me

External links

 Günter Schubert Memorial

1938 births
2008 deaths
People from Weißwasser
People from the Province of Silesia
East German actors
German male film actors
German male television actors
German male voice actors
20th-century German male actors
21st-century German male actors
Deaths from cancer in Germany